Warner Bros. Classics and The  Great Gremlin Adventure was a dark ride located at Warner Bros. Movie World on the Gold Coast, Australia, and Warner Bros. Movie World in Bottrop, Germany (now Movie Park Germany). The ride has been replaced with the Scooby-Doo Spooky Coaster and Van Helsing's Factory in the two parks respectively.

History
On 3 June 1991, Warner Bros. Movie World opened to the public. One of its original attractions was Warner Bros. Classics and The Great Gremlin Adventure. A duplicate of the Australian attraction opened with Warner Bros. Movie World Germany (later renamed Movie Park Germany) on 30 June 1996. It was named Gremlin Invasion. The ride's soft-opening was on 29 June 1996.

On 9 September 2001, Warner Bros. Movie World in Australia announced that they would be closing the attraction to make way for a new attraction set to open in 2002. On 17 June 2002, the Scooby-Doo Spooky Coaster opened in the location of Warner Bros. Classics & Great Gremlins Adventure. In Germany, Gremlin Invasion remained open until the closure of Warner Bros. Movie World Germany on 31 October 2004. The park reopened on 19 March 2005 as Movie Park Germany, however, the ride remained closed. In mid-2011, the ride was replaced with Van Helsing's Factory, a Gerstlauer Bobsled roller coaster.

At Warner Bros. Movie World in Australia, many elements of the ride still exist to this day. The original facade for the attraction exists behind Scooby-Doo Spooky Coasters Spooky Island castle facade. Two of the theatres that were used in the pre-show exist adjacent to the replacement ride's queue. Finally, the unload station still exists (albeit with theming removed) and is used as an evacuation path from the Scooby-Doo Spooky Coaster.

Ride
Riders would queue for the Warner Bros. Classics & Great Gremlins Adventure on the outside of the show building. Groups of riders would be admitted into the building labelled Warner Bros. Studios. Inside guests would be ushered into one of several movie theatres. Here, the riders would watch some outtakes from various Warner Bros. films such as Batman Returns before the screening was interrupted as the Gremlins had taken over. After exiting the theatre, up to 20 riders board a single vehicle which navigates its way throughout the film archive in order to escape the Gremlins. They are taken for a slow trip throughout various sets before exiting the building and being unloaded. Riders would exit past two crashed police cars, similar to those used in the Police Academy Stunt Show (with Gizmo inside one of them).

There is a slight difference between the two different rides that existed; during the ride at Warner Bros. Movie World, the character Beetlejuice appears periodically during the tour of the film archives and studio, where as in the Movie Park Germany version of the ride the character ALF appears not only on the tour, but on film after the initial clips outtakes, getting harassed by the Gremlins.

References

External links
 The Great Gremlins Adventure at Parkz
 Information about the ride at Germany at Gremlins Online

Former Warner Bros. Global Brands and Experiences attractions
Amusement rides introduced in 1991
Amusement rides introduced in 1996
Amusement rides that closed in 2001
Amusement rides that closed in 2004
Animatronic attractions
Dark rides
Movie Park Germany
Warner Bros. Movie World
Gremlins (franchise)